Ezra Furman (born September 5, 1986) is an American musician and songwriter.

Furman was the lead singer and guitarist of Ezra Furman and the Harpoons, formed in 2006, which ended with Mysterious Power (2011). Her subsequent work has included the albums Day of the Dog (2013), Perpetual Motion People (2015), Transangelic Exodus (2018), and All of Us Flames (2022), as well as the soundtrack for the Netflix series Sex Education.

Career

Ezra Furman and the Harpoons

Ezra Furman and the Harpoons were a four-piece rock band active between 2006 and 2011. The band consisted of Ezra Furman (vocals, guitar), Job Mukkada (bass guitar), Drew "Adam" Abrutyn (drums), and Andrew Langer (guitar). They formed at Tufts University in 2006. They released four albums: the self-released Beat Beat Beat (2006), followed by Banging Down the Doors (2007), Inside the Human Body (2008) and Mysterious Power (2011). The group broke up in 2011. After their contract with Minty Fresh Records expired, the band released a self-produced compilation album in 2009, Moon Face: Bootlegs and Road Recordings 2006–2009, which included live recordings and some of Furman's solo work.

The Year of No Returning

After touring in support of the album Mysterious Power, Furman recorded a solo album, entitled The Year of No Returning, without a label. Furman raised money through Kickstarter to fund the recording and self-release of the album. The album was recorded at Studio Ballistico, located at the time in the attic of the house Furman was living in, and produced by Tim Sandusky, who owned both the house and the studio. The album was released in February 2012. At the end of the year, Furman signed to Bar/None Records, who re-released The Year of No Returning in the summer of 2013.

The touring band Ezra Furman and the Boy-Friends formed in spring of 2012 and toured in support of The Year of No Returning. The band consisted of Jorgen Jorgensen (bass), Ben Joseph (keyboard, guitar), and Sam Durkes (drums). Tim Sandusky (saxophone) joined in 2013.

Day of the Dog
Furman released Day of the Dog in October 2013, also produced by Tim Sandusky, recorded at Studio Ballistico and released through Bar/None Records. This album got Furman notable press in the UK, receiving a 5/5 review in The Guardian by Michael Hann: "Ezra Furman has made an album of classicist rock'n'roll that never feels like an exercise, but a living, breathing piece of self expression", and an 8/10 review in NME: "A bratty, ragged take on New York Dolls, Spector-era Ramones and E Street Band carnival rock. An unexpected gem."

The band toured the UK in 2014 and were met with positive press. "The punk-fired rock'n'roller isn't too cool to be touched by a richly deserved rave reception", wrote Malcolm Jack for The Guardian, giving the show a five-star review. The tour finished in the autumn with a sold-out gig at Scala in London in September 2014.

Perpetual Motion People 
In early 2015 Furman signed to Bella Union and on April 27 they announced that a new album, Perpetual Motion People, would be released on July 6 in the UK and Europe and on July 10 in the US. Aided by positive critical reviews Perpetual Motion People peaked in the UK charts on its entry week at number 23. A series of concerts in Europe and the US took place to coordinate with the release of Furman's album.

In 2016 Furman released the EP Big Fugitive Life, saying it felt like the "end of a chapter, musically" and calling the collection a "group of our favourite orphaned songs", four of which missed out on inclusion on Perpetual Motion People, and two which came from the time of The Year of No Returning.

In September 2017, Furman's social media posts indicated that the Boy-Friends, active since 2012, had been renamed or reformed as The Visions. There was no change made to the line-up of Ben Joseph, Jorgen Jorgensen, Sam Durkes, and Tim Sandusky.

Transangelic Exodus 
Transangelic Exodus, Furman's seventh album, was released February 9, 2018. The album follows a narrative of Furman and an angel on the road, running away from an oppressive government.

Other projects 
In 2018, 33⅓ published a book by Furman about Lou Reed's album Transformer.

Furman provided the soundtrack for the 2019 Netflix drama-comedy show Sex Education. The soundtrack consists of songs from her back catalogue, as well as songs written for the show. Furman and their band also appeared in episode seven of the first season of the show, "At the Bottom of the Ocean," making a cameo as the band playing at the main characters' school dance.

Personal life
Furman is Jewish. Her father is from a Jewish family, and her mother converted to Judaism.

Furman plans to become a rabbi, and starting in late 2021, is attending the rabbinical school of Hebrew College in Newton, Massachusetts.

Furman is bisexual, and uses she/her and they/them pronouns. She came out as a transgender woman in late April 2021. Prior to this, they identified as genderqueer.

Furman has three siblings, and has a child. Her younger brother Jonah was the lead singer and bassist of the Boston-based rock band Krill, which broke up in 2015. Their elder brother Noah is a visual artist who designed the cover of the Harpoons album Banging Down The Doors.

Discography

Albums

Ezra Furman and the Harpoons
 Banging Down the Doors (2007)
 Inside the Human Body (2008)
 Mysterious Power (2011)

Solo
 The Year of No Returning (2012)
 Day of the Dog (2013)
 Perpetual Motion People (2015)
 Transangelic Exodus (2018)
 Twelve Nudes (2019)
 All of Us Flames (2022)

Extended plays
 Songs by Others (2016)
 Big Fugitive Life (2016)
 Jam in the Van (2018)

Singles
 "My Zero"/"Caroline Jones" (2013)
 "Restless Year" (2015)
 "Lousy Connection" (2015)
 "Driving Down to LA" (2017)
 "Unbelievers" (2018)
 "Calm Down aka I Should Not Be Alone" (2019)
 "Forever in Sunset" (2022)

References

Living people
1986 births
American rock guitarists
Bisexual musicians
Bisexual women
Guitarists from Chicago
LGBT people from Illinois
21st-century American guitarists
American LGBT singers
American LGBT songwriters
Bella Union artists
Transgender women musicians
Transgender Jews
21st-century American women guitarists
20th-century LGBT people
21st-century LGBT people
Transgender singers
Transgender songwriters
American transgender writers